Rajender Kumar (born 1985) is an Indian wrestler. He beat Pakistan's Azhar Hussain in the Commonwealth Games Delhi.

Career
Kumar started playing wrestling at the school level in Gurukul, Kurukshetra from 1995. In the 2010 Commonwealth Games, Kumar won a gold medal by beating Pakistan's Azhar Hussain by 11-0 in the final of the 55 kg Greco-Roman wrestling competition final on 6 October 2010.

References

External links
 FILA Wrestling - Fйdйration Internationale des Luttes Associйes

Sport wrestlers from Haryana
Wrestlers at the 2010 Commonwealth Games
Living people
Commonwealth Games gold medallists for India
1985 births
People from Kurukshetra
Wrestlers at the 2010 Asian Games
Indian male sport wrestlers
Commonwealth Games medallists in wrestling
South Asian Games gold medalists for India
Asian Games competitors for India
South Asian Games medalists in wrestling
Recipients of the Arjuna Award
Asian Wrestling Championships medalists
20th-century Indian people
21st-century Indian people
Medallists at the 2010 Commonwealth Games